"Born Entertainer" is the first single from Veruca Salt's 2000 album, Resolver. The song is presumed to be about the departure of Nina Gordon (hinted in the line "She didn't get it so fuck her"). It was released in early 2003 in Australia to promote the Australian release of Resolver. Although it failed to reach the US charts, its video reached #50 in MTV rotation during April 2000.

Track listing 
 "Born Entertainer" - 2:40
 "Yeah Man" - 3:31
 "Imperfectly" - 4:18
 "Born Entertainer" (CD-ROM Video) - 2:44

References

2000 singles
Veruca Salt songs
2000 songs
Songs written by Louise Post